John McCormick (August 17, 1893 – May 3, 1961) was an American film producer associated with the Hollywood studio First National Pictures.

Biography
From 1923 to 1930, McCormick was married to Colleen Moore, one of the highest-paid and most popular stars of the silent era. McCormick initially was unconvinced by the development of sound films and vetoed Moore's appearing in them. He changed his mind in 1929 and placed Moore in her first sound film, titled Smiling Irish Eyes, which was not a great success. Their marriage was under increasing strain, and in 1930, the couple divorced.

His relationship with Moore is believed to have been the basis for the film What Price Hollywood? (1932).

Partial filmography

 The Huntress (1923)
 Sally (1925)
 We Moderns (1925)
 Twinkletoes (1926)
 Irene (1926)
 Ella Cinders (1926)
 It Must Be Love (1926)
 Midnight Lovers (1926)
 Naughty but Nice (1927)
 Her Wild Oat (1927)
 Lilac Time (1928)
 Oh, Kay! (1928)
 Smiling Irish Eyes (1929)
 Footlights and Fools (1929)
 Synthetic Sin (1929)
 Why Be Good? (1929)

References

Bibliography
Crafton, Donald. The Talkies: American Cinema's Transition to Sound, 1926-1931. University of California Press, 1999.

External links

1893 births
1961 deaths
Film producers from Missouri
Businesspeople from Kansas City, Missouri
20th-century American businesspeople